Tiepolo is a surname. Notable people with the surname include:

Bajamonte Tiepolo (died after 1329), Venetian nobleman and conspirator

Doges of Venice
Jacopo Tiepolo, Doge between 1229–1249 
Lorenzo Tiepolo, Doge between 1268–1275

Artists
Giovanni Battista Tiepolo (1696–1770), Venetian painter, often referred to solely as Tiepolo
Giovanni Domenico Tiepolo (1727–1804), son of Giovanni Battista
Lorenzo Baldissera Tiepolo (1736–1776), son of Giovanni Battista and younger brother of Giovanni Domenico